Scooby-Doo's Snack Tracks: The Ultimate Collection is the first and only soundtrack to the popular Hanna-Barbera Saturday morning cartoon franchise Scooby-Doo. The soundtrack consist of songs and theme songs from the incarnations produced from 1969 to 1985, from Scooby-Doo, Where Are You! to The 13 Ghosts of Scooby-Doo. Three songs, "Move Over", "Ruby Cool Guy" and "Gotta Have Time", were taken from the 1979 animated telefilm Scooby Goes Hollywood. A bonus track, called "Scooby's Mystery Mix", takes a majority of the sound bites included on the soundtrack as a musical mix. The sound bites featured on the soundtrack were taken primarily from the second season of Scooby-Doo, Where Are You!, but also from a few episodes of The New Scooby-Doo Movies, and features the entire cast from both series. Two guest stars from The New Scooby-Doo Movies, Jerry Reed and Davy Jones, appeared on the soundtrack singing the songs they performed in their guest-appearance episodes. The soundtrack was released on CD and cassette tape on September 15, 1998. It was later discontinued.

The album peaked at number five on the Billboard Kids Album chart.

Critical reception

Jason Ankeny of Allmusic gave a mixed review of the soundtrack. He praised the songs from the Scooby-Doo, Where Are You! (1969-1970) series stating that the songs are "pleasantly kitschy bubblegum confections". Ankeny stated that the inclusion of later theme songs were "far less engaging" and that the songs by Jerry Reed and Davy Jones, as well as the song "Me and My Shadow", ranged "from the harmless to the tedious" and that the bonus remix, "Scooby's Mystery Mix", was "a lame techno remix." The album was rated three out of five stars.

Track listing

Personnel
Credits for Scooby-Doo's Snack Tracks: The Ultimate Collection were adapted from Allmusic.

Joseph Barbera – director, producer
Craig Bartock – producer
Bodie Chandler – director
Craig DeGraff – producer
Dave Dreyer – composer
Bob Fisher – mastering
William Hanna - director, producer
Scott Innes – liner notes
Nicole Jaffe - voices (Velma Dinkley)
Arte Johnson – voices
Al Jolson – composer

Davy Jones – performer
Casey Kasem – voices (Shaggy Rogers)
Don Messick – voices (Scooby-Doo!)
Howard Morris – voices
Heather North - voices (Daphne Blake)
Vincent Price – voices
Jerry Reed – performer
Billy Rose – composer
Maria Villar – design
Frank Welker – voices (Fred Jones)

Charts

See also
Scooby-Doo
Scooby-Doo (disambiguation)

References

External links
Allmusic

Television soundtracks
1998 soundtrack albums
Scooby-Doo soundtracks
Kid Rhino albums
Cartoon Network albums